The Saskatchewan Huskies women's basketball team represents the University of Saskatchewan in the Canada West Universities Athletic Association of U Sports women's basketball. The Huskies have captured two national championships, winning the first in 2016, followed by a victory in 2020. Led by head coach Lisa Thomaidis, who first led the program for the 1998-99 season, she has also served as head coach of the Canada women's national basketball team. Holding the program record for regular season wins (281), Canada West playoff wins (49) and U Sports National Tournament wins (19), the Huskies have also won eight Canada West titles under her tutelage. Home games are contested at the Physical Activity Complex (PAC), which was constructed in 2003.

History
In the 2019-20 season, the Huskies finished in first place in Canada West with a record of 18-2. Scoring 1920 points, averaging 96.0 points per game, the Huskies led all teams in Canada West play. Additionally, their 1260 points allowed (63.0 points per game), resulted in a differential of 33 points, which was tops in Canada West.

Recent season-by-season record

Recent U Sports Tournament results

Statistics

Individual Leader Scoring

Canada West Statistical Leaders

3-PT Field Goal Percentage
2019-20: Sabine Dukate - 59 three point field goals, 157 three point field goals attempted, .376 percentage

All-Time Leaders

Scoring

International
Megan Lindquist Saskatchewan  2017 Summer Universiade
Megan Ahlstrom : 2019 Summer Universiade
Kyla Shand : 2019 Summer Universiade
Lisa Thomaidis:  Head coach 2015 Pan American Games Gold Medal, 2015 FIBA Americas Gold Medal, 2016 Rio Olympics (7th place)

Awards and honours
Lisa Thomaidis, 2016 CAAWS Women of Influence Award

Canada West Awards
2005-06 Sarah Crooks, Canada West Player of the Year
2006-07 Sarah Crooks, Canada West Player of the Year
Lisa Thomaidis: Canada West Coach of the Year - 2004, 2006, 2009, 2011 and 2016

Canada West Hall of Fame
Sarah Crooks: 2020 inductee

U Sports Awards
2005-06 Sarah Crooks, Nan Copp Award
2006-07 Sarah Crooks, Nan Copp Award

Lisa Thomaidis: 2008-09 Canadian Interuniversity Sport Coach of the Year
Lisa Thomaidis: 2010-11 Canadian Interuniversity Sport Coach of the Year

Antoinette Miller, Top 100 U Sports women's basketball Players of the Century (1920-2020).

All-Canadians
2005-06: Sarah Crooks, Canadian Interuniversity Sport First-Team All-Canadian
2006-07: Sarah Crooks, Canadian Interuniversity Sport First-Team All-Canadian
2018-19: Sabine Dukate, U First Team All-Canadian

U Sports Nationals
2015-16: Dalyce Emmerson, U Sports championship MVP
2019-20: Sabine Dukate, U Sports championship MVP

All-Tournament Team
2019-20: Sabine Dukate, Saskatchewan
2019-20: Summer Masikewich, Saskatchewan

University awards
2020 Valerie Girsberger Trophy (in recognition of leadership, sportsmanship, academic ability): Megan Ahlstrom
Colb McEwon Trophy: 2006, 2009, 2011, 2016, 2020 (Saskatchewan Huskies Athletics Coach of the Year) - Lisa Thomaidis

References 

Sport in Saskatchewan
Basketball, women's
U Sports women's basketball teams
Women in Saskatchewan